Apatetris mediterranella is a moth of the family Gelechiidae. It was described by Jacques Nel and Thierry Varenne in 2012. It is found in southern France and Italy.

The wingspan is 8–10 mm.

References

Moths described in 2012
Apatetris
Moths of Europe